Andrew Pleavin (born 13 April 1968) is an English actor known for his appearances in the TV film Attila, Unstoppable, Batman Begins, Attack of the Gryphon, Return to House on Haunted Hill and his roles in the British police dramas Messiah III: the Promise and The Bill. In February 2006, he was cast in 300 by Frank Miller, a film in which he played a character called Daxos.
Andrew was born in England but spent his early years in Transvaal, South Africa. He returned to the UK and to the Wirral in Northern England, aged 12, and received a black belt status in martial arts at the age of 18 after six years of training in Liverpool and London.

From 1993 to 1996, he trained at the London Drama Centre.

Filmography

External links

GymJones.com "300" The So-Called Program.

1968 births
English male film actors
English male television actors
Living people
Male actors from London
Alumni of the Drama Centre London